Perovka is a rural locality (a selo) in Semyonovskoye Rural Settlement, Verkhnekhavsky District, Voronezh Oblast, Russia. The population was 123 as of 2010. There are 3 streets.

Geography 
Perovka is located 11 km northeast of Verkhnyaya Khava (the district's administrative centre) by road. Bolshaya Mikhaylovka is the nearest rural locality.

References 

Rural localities in Verkhnekhavsky District